Higashi-osaka held a by-election on August 6 for two seats for the Osaka Prefectural Assembly. One seat went to Liberal Democratic Party candidate Kōichi Nishino and the second to Japanese Communist Party candidate Makoto Kuchihara.

Candidates
The candidates, who were all male, were as follows:
, later Osaka Prefectural Assemblyman, age 32
, 2003 council candidate at Higashi-osaka, age 46
, later member of the House of Representatives, age 35
, later member of the House of Representatives, age 37
, former councillor at Higashi-osaka, age 33

Results

References

Higashiōsaka
Local elections in Japan
2006 elections in Japan
2006 in Japan
August 2006 events in Japan
Elections in Osaka Prefecture